In mathematics, Fermat's theorem (also known as interior extremum theorem) is a method to find local maxima and minima of differentiable functions on open sets by showing that every local extremum of the function is a stationary point (the function's derivative is zero at that point).  Fermat's theorem is a theorem in real analysis, named after Pierre de Fermat.

Fermat's theorem gives only a necessary condition for extreme function values, as some stationary points are inflection points (not a maximum or minimum). The function's second derivative, if it exists, can sometimes be used to determine whether a stationary point is a maximum or minimum.

Statement
One way to state Fermat's theorem is that, if a function has a local extremum at some point and is differentiable there, then the function's derivative at that point must be zero. In precise mathematical language:

Let  be a function and suppose that  is a point where  has a local extremum.

Another way to understand the theorem is via the contrapositive statement: if the derivative of a function at any point is not zero, then there is not a local extremum at that point. Formally:

Corollary
The global extrema of a function f on a domain A occur only at boundaries, non-differentiable points, and stationary points.
If  is a global extremum of f, then one of the following is true:
 boundary:  is in the boundary of A
 non-differentiable: f is not differentiable at 
 stationary point:  is a stationary point of f

Extension

In higher dimensions, exactly the same statement holds; however, the proof is slightly more complicated. The complication is that in 1 dimension, one can either move left or right from a point, while in higher dimensions, one can move in many directions. Thus, if the derivative does not vanish, one must argue that there is some direction in which the function increases – and thus in the opposite direction the function decreases. This is the only change to the proof or the analysis.

The statement can also be extended to differentiable manifolds.

Applications

Fermat's theorem is central to the calculus method of determining maxima and minima: in one dimension, one can find extrema by simply computing the stationary points (by computing the zeros of the derivative), the non-differentiable points, and the boundary points, and then investigating this set to determine the extrema.

One can do this either by evaluating the function at each point and taking the maximum, or by analyzing the derivatives further, using the first derivative test, the second derivative test, or the higher-order derivative test.

Intuitive argument
It can only attain a maximum or minimum if it "stops" – if the derivative vanishes (or if it is not differentiable, or if one runs into the boundary and cannot continue). However, making "behaves like a linear function" precise requires careful analytic proof.

More precisely, the intuition can be stated as: if the derivative is positive, there is some point to the right of  where f is greater, and some point to the left of  where f is less, and thus f attains neither a maximum nor a minimum at  Conversely, if the derivative is negative, there is a point to the right which is lesser, and a point to the left which is greater. Stated this way, the proof is just translating this into equations and verifying "how much greater or less".

The intuition is based on the behavior of polynomial functions. Assume that function f has a maximum at x0, the reasoning being similar for a function minimum. If  is a local maximum then, roughly, there is a (possibly small) neighborhood of  such as the function "is increasing before" and "decreasing after" . As the derivative is positive for an increasing function and negative for a decreasing function,  is positive before and negative after .  doesn't skip values (by Darboux's theorem), so it has to be zero at some point between the positive and negative values.

It is sufficient for the function to be differentiable only in the extreme point.

Proof

Proof 1: Non-vanishing derivatives implies not extremum 

The schematic of the proof is:
 an infinitesimal statement about derivative (tangent line) at  implies
 a local statement about difference quotients (secant lines) near  which implies
 a local statement about the value of f near 

Formally, by the definition of derivative,  means that

In particular, for sufficiently small  (less than some ), the quotient must be at least  by the definition of limit. Thus on the interval  one has:

one has replaced the equality in the limit (an infinitesimal statement) with an inequality on a neighborhood (a local statement). Thus, rearranging the equation, if  then:

so on the interval to the left, f is less than 

Thus  is not a local or global maximum or minimum of f.

Proof 2: Extremum implies derivative vanishes 
Alternatively, one can start by assuming that  is a local maximum, and then prove that the derivative is 0.

Suppose that  is a local maximum (a similar proof applies if  is a local minimum). Hence for any  we have

Since the limit of this ratio as  gets close to 0 from above exists and is equal to  we conclude that . On the other hand, for  we notice that

but again the limit as  gets close to 0 from below exists and is equal to  so we also have .

Hence we conclude that

Cautions 
A subtle misconception that is often held in the context of Fermat's theorem is to assume that it makes a stronger statement about local behavior than it does. Notably, Fermat's theorem does not say that functions (monotonically) "increase up to" or "decrease down from" a local maximum. This is very similar to the misconception that a limit means "monotonically getting closer to a point". For "well-behaved functions" (which here means continuously differentiable), some intuitions hold, but in general functions may be ill-behaved, as illustrated below. The moral is that derivatives determine infinitesimal behavior, and that continuous derivatives determine local behavior.

Continuously differentiable functions 

If  and  then by continuity of the derivative, there is some  such that  for all . Then f is increasing on this interval, by the mean value theorem: the slope of any secant line is at least  as it equals the slope of some tangent line.

Pathological functions 
If one extends this function by defining  then the extended function is continuous and everywhere differentiable (it is differentiable at 0 with derivative 0), but has rather unexpected behavior near 0: in any neighborhood of 0 it attains 0 infinitely many times, but also equals  (a positive number) infinitely often.

This reflects the oscillation between increasing and decreasing values as it approaches 0.

See also 
 Optimization (mathematics)
 Maxima and minima
 Derivative
 Extreme value
 arg max 
 Adequality

Notes

References

External links
 
 

Theorems in real analysis
Differential calculus
Articles containing proofs
Theorems in calculus